Breaking the Silence may refer to:

Films 
Breaking the Silence (TV film) a 1992 made-for-TV film directed by Robert Iscove
 Breaking the Silence (film), a 2000 Chinese film
 Breaking the Silence: Truth and Lies in the War on Terror, a 2003 documentary film
 Lima: Breaking the Silence, a 1998 film based on the 1997 Japanese embassy hostage crisis in Lima
 1912: Breaking the Silence, a three-part documentary series by Gloria Rolando

Music 
 Breaking the Silence (album), a 1987 album by Heathen
 Breaking the Silence (EP), an EP by The Letter Black
 "Breaking the Silence", a song by Breaking Benjamin from their album Dark Before Dawn
 "Breaking the Silence", a song by Queensrÿche from their album Operation: Mindcrime
 Breaking the Silence (Firewind song), a 2007 single by Firewind
 Breaking the Silence, former name of Christian rock band The Letter Black

Other 
 Breaking the Silence, a 1990 autobiography by Mariette Hartley, written with Anne Commire
 Breaking the Silence (organization), Israeli NGO established by IDF soldiers and veterans
 Breaking the silence NSW, 2006 report of the Aboriginal Sexual Assault Taskforce in New South Wales, Australia
 Breaking the Silence, a stage play by Stephen Poliakof

See also
Break the Silence (disambiguation)